The Samuel French Morse Poetry Prize, in honor of Samuel French Morse, is a literary award given to an American author's first or second book of poetry.

The annual prize was established in 1983 and sponsored by Northeastern University. Once selected by a recognized poet, the awarded poet received $1000, and the work received publication by Northeastern University Press, and distribution through the University Press of New England. Prize-winning books were published with a striped cover design, characteristic of the Morse Poetry Prize.

The award was suspended in 2009, due to difficulties with financial sustainability.

Winners
2009: Lisa Gluskin Stonestreet, Tulips, Water, Ash, Judge: Jean Valentine
2008: Dana Roeser, In the Truth Room
2007: Virginia Chase Sutton, What Brings You to Del Amo
2005: Roy Jacobstein, A Form of Optimism
2004: Annie Boutelle, Nest of Thistles
2003: Dana Roeser, Beautiful Motion: Poems
2002: Chris Forhan, The Actual Moon, the Actual Stars
2001: Catherine Sasanov, All the Blood Tethers
2000: Ted Genoways, Bullroarer: A Sequence
1999: Jennifer Atkinson, The Drowned City
1998: James Haug, Walking Liberty
1997: Jeffrey Greene, American Spirituals
1996: Charles Harper Webb, Reading the Water
1995: Michelle Boisseau, Understory
1994: Allison Funk, Living at the Epicenter
1993: David Moolten, Plums and Ashes
1992: Don Boes, The Eighth Continent
1991: Carl Phillips, In the Blood
1990: George Mills, The House Sails Out of Sight of Home
1989: J. Allyn Rosser, Bright Moves
1988: Lucia Perillo, Dangerous Life
1987: Frank Gaspar, The Holyoke
1986: Sue Ellen Thompson, This Body of Silk
1985: William Carpenter, Rain
1984: Susan Donnelly, Eve Names the Animals, Judge: Anthony Hecht

See also
American poetry
List of poetry awards
List of literary awards
List of years in poetry
List of years in literature

References

American poetry awards
Awards established in 1983